Decisive Weapons is a television series made by the BBC in association with the US channel A&E. It ran for two years airing on BBC2 in the UK from 1996 to 1997.

The series was devised and produced by Martin Davidson who also co-wrote the book Decisive Weapons with series researcher Adam Levy.

Episodes

Series One (1996)
"Queen of Tanks" – T-34 at the Battle of Kursk (dir: John Farren)
"Vietnam Warhorse" – Bell Huey Helicopter in the Battle of Ia Drang (dir: Paul Tilzey)
"Cadillac of the Skies" – P-51 Mustang at the Battle of Berlin (dir: David Upshal)
"Cold Steel" – the Bayonet at the Battle of Culloden (dir: Paul Tilzey)
"Wood Against Steel" – the English longbow at the Battle of Agincourt (dir: Adam Levy)
"Jumping Jet Flash" – Harrier jump jet in the Falklands War (dir: David Upshal)

Series Two (1997)
"The Forgotten Fighter" – Hawker Hurricane in the Battle of Britain (dir: Liz Hartford)
"Wings Over The Ocean" – the aircraft carrier at the Battle of Midway (dir: David Upshal)
"Lock, Stock And Barrel" – Springfield Rifle in the American Civil War (dir: Daniel Gold)
"U-Boat Killer" – the Anti-Submarine Warship in the Battle of the Atlantic (dir: Paul Tilzey)
"Soul of the Samurai" – the Japanese Samurai Sword (dir: Navid Akhtar)
"Darkness Visible" – F-117 Stealth Fighter in the Gulf War (dir: Paul Tilzey)

References

External links
 

BBC television documentaries
1990s British documentary television series
1996 British television series debuts
1997 British television series endings
Documentary television series about aviation